Mont Puke, also known as Mont Singavi, is the highest point of the French Polynesian island territory of Wallis and Futuna, at an elevation of 524 metres (1,719 ft).

Sources
  Mont Puke, Wallis and Futuna, Peakbagger.com.
  , cia.gov.

Puke
Mountains of Oceania